Hotel Adolphus (often referred to as "The Adolphus") is an upscale hotel in the Main Street District of Downtown Dallas Dallas, Texas. A Dallas Landmark, it was for several years the tallest building in the state. Today, the hotel is part of Marriott Hotel's Autograph Collection.

History
The Adolphus was opened on October 5, 1912, built by the founder of the Anheuser-Busch company, Adolphus Busch, in a Beaux Arts style designed by Thomas P. Barnett of Barnett, Haynes & Barnett of St. Louis.  Busch's intention in constructing the hotel was to establish the first grand and posh hotel in the city of Dallas.  Under the management of Otto Schubert from 1922–1946, the hotel grew to national prominence.  With 22 floors standing a total of 312 feet (95 m), the building was the tallest in Texas until it was dwarfed by the Magnolia Petroleum Building (now the Magnolia Hotel) just down the street in August 1922.  The Adolphus  underwent a series of expansions, first in 1916, then 1926 and finally in 1950, at the time giving the hotel a total of 1,200 rooms.

In the 1930s it was run by hotel industry pioneer Ralph Hitz's National Hotel Management Company  and played host to many big band musicians of the era, including Tommy and Jimmy Dorsey, Benny Goodman and Glenn Miller.

The Adolphus has been the host of many respected leaders of business, government and entertainment, including presidents, from Warren G. Harding to George H. W. Bush.  Elizabeth II and Prince Philip also stayed at the hotel in 1991. This hotel was a Dallas hub for entertainment and provided a platform that helped developing careers, such as Bob Hope, Jack Benny and others.  North American Aviation (P-51 Mustangs, World War II) and others benefitted from its position as a Texas business hub.
During the 1980s, the Adolphus underwent a $]80 million renovation, enlarging and modernizing the already-luxurious guestrooms.  It also shrunk the total number of guestrooms to 428 to make the rooms more spacious. The Adolphus was added to the National Register of Historic Places in 1983.

The Hotel has been named one of the top ten in the United States by Condé Nast Traveler and also receives high ratings from Zagat, Fodor's and Frommer's.

The structure is a Dallas Landmark and listed on the National Register of Historic Places.

Gallery

See also

National Register of Historic Places listings in Dallas County, Texas
Recorded Texas Historic Landmarks in Dallas County
List of Dallas Landmarks

References

External links

National Register of Historic Places narrative

History of Dallas
Autograph Collection Hotels
Skyscraper hotels in Dallas
Busch family
Hotel buildings completed in 1912
National Register of Historic Places in Dallas
Recorded Texas Historic Landmarks
Dallas Landmarks
Beaux-Arts architecture in Texas
1912 establishments in Texas
Hotel buildings on the National Register of Historic Places in Texas